Aelurillus brutus is a jumping spider species in the genus Aelurillus. The female was first identified by Wanda Wesołowska in 1996 and the male by Galina Azarkina in 2003.

Description
Closely related to Aelurillus helvanacius, Aelurillus brutus is a small spider.

Distribution
The species lives in Kazakhstan and Turkmenistan. It is its distribution rather than its morphology that differentiates the female from Aelurillus ater and Aelurillus dubatolovi.

References

Salticidae
Spiders of Central Asia
Spiders described in 1996
Taxa named by Wanda Wesołowska